The 2004/05 NBL All-Star Game was held at the Townsville Entertainment Centre in Townsville, Queensland on 19 January 2005.  The attendance for this All-Star game was 5078 spectators.

The Aussie All-Stars defeated the World All-Stars 156-140.  Rookie Brad Newley from the Townsville Crocodiles won the All-Star MVP award, contributing 35 points to the Aussie All-Stars total.  Other leading scorers for the Aussie All-Stars included John Rillie with 23 points and Jason Smith with 22 points.  For the World All-Stars Robert Brown top scored with 31 points, followed by Brian Wethers with 28 and Willie Farley with 24.

Line-up

Aussies
Head Coach: Phil Smyth (Adelaide 36ers)

World
Head Coach: Brian Goorjian (Sydney Kings)

Shane Heal was selected for the Aussies but he stepped down to allow younger players to come forward.

Dunk Competition

The Dunk Competition was won by Robert Brown of the Townsville Crocodiles.

Other competitors in the Dunk Competition included:
 David Barlow (Sydney Kings)
 Oscar Forman (Adelaide 36ers)
 Deba George (Cairns Taipans)
 Liam Rush (Perth Wildcats)
 Brian Wethers (Hunter Pirates)

See also
NBL (Australia) All-Star Game
National Basketball League (Australia)

References

Match Report
Box Score

External links
  Official site of the NBL

2004/05
Sport in Townsville
All-Star Game
Basketball in Queensland
Sports competitions in Queensland